Jiu Jitsu is a 2020 American science fiction martial arts film directed and co-written by Dimitri Logothetis and starring Alain Moussi, Frank Grillo, JuJu Chan, Tony Jaa and Nicolas Cage.  The film is based on the 2017 comic book of the same name by Logothetis and Jim McGrath. The film was a box office bomb, grossing less than $100,000 against a budget of over $25 million, and was critically panned.

Plot
Every six years, an ancient order of expert Jiu Jitsu fighters faces a vicious race of alien invaders in a battle for Earth. For thousands of years the invaders have lost to Earth's defenders, up until now. Earth's future is in jeopardy.

In a jungle in Burma (Myanmar) Asia, Jake Barnes, a celebrated war hero, is running away from shuriken under the command of Brax, the powerful invader leader. Jake ends up on an oceanside cliff, where he is hit by the stars, falls into the ocean, hits his head and blacks out.

Wylie, a senior Jiu Jitsu fighter, rescues Jake from the water and gives him over to the care of two Burmese fishermen. They stitch up Jake's cuts and take him to a nearby military outpost, assuming that he came from there. After foreboding miscommunication between an inexperienced translator and one of the fisherwomen, Jake is left at the outpost and starts to regain consciousness. But he must regain his strength! Puzzled by the mention of a comet that comes every six years and a hole in a temple opening, the operatives set about figuring out where Jake came from. An intelligence officer, Myra, tries to interrogate Jake but he appears to have amnesia, with no recall of events leading to his being found in the water.

After a fight sequence Myra injects Jake with a truth serum, but this proves ineffective on what he divulges. She decides it is probable that he actually does not remember, but while discussing this with other operatives, Keung, advanced Jiu Jitsu fighter, begins to work his way through the base, besting fist and gun alike. Keung is unfazed by repeated attacks by men in balaclavas and fatigue uniforms, who he lays flat. Gunfire and the sound of feet against chests, heads and the like alert Myra and the others that indeed something is up. After more fighting, Keung approaches Jake who he recognizes with a special handclasp. Keung exclaims "We gotta go" and Jake accepts this chance to leave his captors. Their departure from the base confirms that Jake, too, is skilled in the art of using his limbs in defense against others.

Jake then reunites with three other fighters who seem to know him but he doesn't remember who they are or what his mission is. As they try to leave to head back to their base, soldiers turn up again. The three other fighters defeat the entire unit easily but Jake gets grabbed by Myra. She tried questioning him again back at the military base but he simply tells her she should leave. They then decide to move out from the army base as they try to escape but they are hunted down by an alien called Brax. The group confronts Brax at the temple and fight him. During the fight, it is revealed that Brax has a weakness to fire and uses that to his advantage. Jake manages to cut down Brax with a sword and shove a grenade in his gut before it heals up. He kicks Brax into the portal and it explodes finally ending the alien race.

Cast
 Alain Moussi as Jake Barnes
 Frank Grillo as Harrigan
 Nicolas Cage as Wylie
 JuJu Chan as Carmen
 Tony Jaa as Keung
 Maresse Crump as Forbes 
 Ryan Tarran as Brax
 June Sasitorn as June
 Dan Rizutto as Franz
 Rigan Machado as Victor
 Rick Yune as Captain Sand
 Marie Avgeropoulos as Myra
 Jack Kingsley as Hector
 Eddie Steeples as Tex

Production
It was announced in March 2019 that Cage and Alain Moussi were cast in the film.

Filming took place in June 2019 in Cyprus and included a glimpse of ancient Bagan temples in Burma.

Release
Jiu Jitsu was released on November 20, 2020 by The Avenue Entertainment. In its debut weekend, the film was the eighth-most rented title on Apple TV and ninth on FandangoNow.

Reception 
The website's critical consensus reads: "Jiu Jitsu pits an ancient order of warriors against an alien invasion -- yet despite that appealingly bizarre premise and a cast that includes Nicolas Cage and Tony Jaa, it's the audience that loses." On Metacritic, the film has a weighted average score of 28 out of 100, based on reviews from 11 critics, indicating "generally unfavorable reviews."

Simon Abrams of RogerEbert.com awarded the film one and a half stars. John DeFore of The Hollywood Reporter gave the film a negative review, noting that it "has all the barely-motivated action and sci-fi trappings of a middling videogame and, well, at least a little of the dramatic value." Tambay Obenson of IndieWire graded the film a D. Jeffrey M. Anderson of Common Sense Media gave the film two stars out of five. Slant Magazine's Steven Scaife awarded the film one and a half stars out of four. Chris Bumbray of JoBlo.com gave the film a 5 out of 10.

Fortress of Solitude praised the film describing it as: "An action-packed, 90s-style camp film that’s all about entertainment". "Flyckering Myth" also had a positive reaction, Tom Joliffe writing that: "With a stellar cast, non-stop fights and stylish direction, this proves to be an enjoyable throwback that will please genre fans".
Polygon called the film "extremely satisfying". Dan Jackson of Thrillist gave the film a positive review, writing "Luckily, Jiu Jitsu gets the most important aspects of a junky movie like this right."

Darren Murray from Martial Arts Actions Cinema rated the film 3 out of 5.
Brent McKnight on Giant Freakin Robot also gave the film a positive rating.

Film School Rejects's Rob Hunter promoted the film positively, noting that, "[...] while it neglects to include any jiu-jitsu... it does give viewers plenty of action beats and a few fun thrills".

Kristy Puchko of IGN gave it 6 out of 10 and wrote "Jiu Jitsu feels like a deeply 2020 movie in that it is a barrage of WTF choices that hit without mercy until you either give in and go with the flow or just go mad. Or, hey, maybe both." She also questioned some of the film's visual design choices, such as using animated comic book panels and a saturated color scheme.
J. Hurtado of Screen Anarchy reviewed the film negatively, calling it "an Adderall addled mess of a film that attempts to scratch a gonzo action itch that would be better served by hitting up a playlist of stunt demo reels on YouTube."

Jiu Jitsu had a cumulative worldwide gross of $99,924  against a budget of $25 million.

Future
Logothetis confirmed he was working on a sequel, and expressed his interest in casting big-names such as Scott Adkins, Michael Jai White, and Donnie Yen, despite Cage not returning.

References

External links
 

2020 science fiction action films
2020 martial arts films
American science fiction action films
American films with live action and animation
American martial arts films
Films about extraterrestrial life
Films about amnesia
Films set in Myanmar
Films shot in Cyprus
Films shot from the first-person perspective
Martial arts science fiction films
Live-action films based on comics
2020s fantasy action films
Films directed by Dimitri Logothetis
2020s English-language films
2020s American films